Alejandra del Carmen León Gastélum (born 9 June 1976) is a Mexican politician who is the MORENA Senator from the State of Baja California.

Education 
She graduated from Mexicali Institute of Technology.

Career 
In April 2021, she resigned from MORENA and joined the Labor Party.

References 

Living people
1976 births
21st-century Mexican politicians
21st-century Mexican women politicians
Labor Party (Mexico) politicians
Morena (political party) politicians
Senators of the LXIV and LXV Legislatures of Mexico
Politicians from Baja California
Women members of the Senate of the Republic (Mexico)
Mexicali Institute of Technology alumni